Scott Eric Urch (born July 25, 1965) is a former American football tackle who played for the New York Giants of the National Football League (NFL). He played college football at University of Virginia.

References 

1965 births
Living people
American football offensive tackles
Virginia Cavaliers football players
New York Giants players